The 1978 Wichita State Shockers football team was an American football team that represented  Wichita State as a member of the Missouri Valley Conference during the 1978 NCAA Division I-A football season. In their fifth year under head coach Jim Wright, the team compiled a 4–7 record.

Schedule

References

Wichita State
Wichita State Shockers football seasons
Wichita State Shockers football